The Trades Hall is one of the oldest Edwardian buildings in the city of Johannesburg. Beyond its architectural importance, the building has historical significance as the previous headquarters of the Trade Unions. It is associated with many historical events such as the 1922 Rand Revolt. In 1986 it was listed as one of Johannesburg's 100 most important heritage buildings.

References 

Buildings and structures in Johannesburg
Heritage Buildings in Johannesburg